Mykhailivka may refer to several places in Ukraine:

Cherkasy Oblast
Mykhailivka, Kaniv urban hromada, Cherkasy Raion, Cherkasy Oblast
Mykhailivka, Mykhailivka rural hromada, Cherkasy Raion, Cherkasy Oblast
Mykhailivka, Chornobai settlement hromada, Zolotonosha Raion, Cherkasy Oblast
Mykhailivka, Drabiv settlement hromada, Zolotonosha Raion, Cherkasy Oblast
Mykhailivka, Vodianyky rural hromada, Zvenyhorodka Raion, Cherkasy Oblast
Mykhailivka, Zvenyhorodka urban hromada, Zvenyhorodka Raion, Cherkasy Oblast

Chernihiv Oblast
Mykhailivka, Koriukivka Raion, Chernihiv Oblast
Mykhailivka, Novhorod-Siverskyi Raion, Chernihiv Oblast

Chernivtsi Oblast
Mykhailivka, Chernivtsi Raion, Chernivtsi Oblast
Mykhailivka, Dnistrovskyi Raion, Chernivtsi Oblast

Crimea
Mykhailivka, Nyzhniohirskyi Raion, Crimea
Mykhailivka, Saky Raion, Crimea

Dnipropetrovsk Oblast
 Mykhailivka, Dnipro Raion, Dnipropetrovsk Oblast
 Mykhailivka, Lykhivka settlement hromada, Kamianske Raion, Dnipropetrovsk Oblast
 Mykhailivka, Zatyshne rural hromada, Kamianske Raion, Dnipropetrovsk Oblast
 Mykhailivka, Apostolove urban hromada, Kryvyi Rih, Dnipropetrovsk Oblast
 Mykhailivka, Sofiivka settlement hromada, Kryvyi Rih, Dnipropetrovsk Oblast
 Mykhailivka, Nikopol Raion, Dnipropetrovsk Oblast
 Mykhailivka, Novomoskovsk Raion, Dnipropetrovsk Oblast
 Mykhailivka, Synelnykove Raion, Dnipropetrovsk Oblast

Donetsk Oblast
Mykhailivka, Donetsk Raion, Donetsk Oblast
Mykhailivka, Horlivka urban hromada, Horlivka Raion, Donetsk Oblast
Mykhailivka, Khrestivka urban hromada, Horlivka Raion, Donetsk Oblast
Mykhailivka, Kalmiuske Raion, Donetsk Oblast
Mykhailivka, Kramatorsk Raion, Donetsk Oblast
Mykhailivka, Hrodivka settlement hromada, Pokrovsk Raion, Donetsk Oblast
Mykhailivka, Novohrodivka urban hromada, Pokrovsk Raion, Donetsk Oblast

Kharkiv Oblast
Mykhailivka, Krasnokutsk settlement hromada, Bohodukhiv Raion, Kharkiv Oblast
Mykhailivka, Valky urban hromada, Bohodukhiv Raion, Kharkiv Oblast
Mykhailivka, Chuhuiv Raion, Kharkiv Oblast
Mykhailivka, Kharkiv Raion, Kharkiv Oblast
Mykhailivka (Nyzhnii Burluk), Shevchenko settlement hromada, Kupiansk Raion, Kharkiv Oblast
Mykhailivka (Shevchenko), Shevchenko settlement hromada, Kupiansk Raion, Kharkiv Oblast
Mykhailivka, Velykyi Burluk settlement hromada, Kupiansk Raion, Kharkiv Oblast
Mykhailivka, Lozova urban hromada, Lozova Raion, Kharkiv Oblast
Mykhailivka, Oleksiivka rural hromada, Lozova Raion, Kharkiv Oblast

Kherson Oblast
Mykhailivka, Beryslav Raion, Kherson Oblast
Mykhailivka, Henichesk Raion, Kherson Oblast
Mykhailivka, Kakhovka Raion, Kherson Oblast
Mykhailivka, Skadovsk Raion, Kherson Oblast

Khmelnytskyi Oblast
Mykhailivka, Chemerivtsi settlement hromada, Kamianets-Podilskyi Raion, Khmelnytskyi Oblast
Mykhailivka, Dunaivtsi urban hromada, Kamianets-Podilskyi Raion, Khmelnytskyi Oblast
Mykhailivka, Iziaslav urban hromada, Shepetivka Raion, Khmelnytskyi Oblast
Mykhailivka, Slavuta urban hromada, Shepetivka Raion, Khmelnytskyi Oblast
Mykhailivka, Khmelnytskyi Raion, Khmelnytskyi Oblast

Kirovohrad Oblast
Mykhailivka, Kropyvnytskyi Raion, Kirovohrad Oblast
Mykhailivka, Hlodosy rural hromada, Novoukrainka Raion, Kirovohrad Oblast
Mykhailivka, Dobrovelychkivka settlement hromada, Novoukrainka Raion, Kirovohrad Oblast
Mykhailivka, Oleksandriia Raion, Kirovohrad Oblast

Kyiv Oblast
Mykhailivka, Tetiiv urban hromada, Bila Tserkva Raion, Kyiv Oblast
Mykhailivka, Uzyn urban hromada, Bila Tserkva Raion, Kyiv Oblast
Mykhailivka, Volodarka settlement hromada, Bila Tserkva Raion, Kyiv Oblast
Mykhailivka, Brovary Raion, Kyiv Oblast
Mykhailivka, Obukhiv Raion, Kyiv Oblast

Luhansk Oblast
Mykhailivka, Alchevsk Raion, Luhansk Oblast
Mykhailivka, Kreminna Raion, Luhansk Oblast
Mykhailivka, Novoaidar Raion, Luhansk Oblast
Mykhailivka, Rovenky Raion, Luhansk Oblast
Mykhailivka, Stanytsia-Luhanska Raion, Luhansk Oblast
Mykhailivka, Svatove Raion, Luhansk Oblast

Lviv Oblast
Mykhailivka, Lviv Oblast

Mykolaiv Oblast
Mykhailivka, Bashtanka rural hromada, Bashtanka Raion, Mykolaiv Oblast
Mykhailivka, Kazanka settlement hromada, Bashtanka Raion, Mykolaiv Oblast
Mykhailivka, Snihurivka urban hromada, Bashtanka Raion, Mykolaiv Oblast
Mykhailivka, Berezanka settlement hromada, Mykolaiv Raion, Mykolaiv Oblast
Mykhailivka, Mykolaiv urban hromada, Mykolaiv Raion, Mykolaiv Oblast
Mykhailivka, Nova Odesa urban hromada, Mykolaiv Raion, Mykolaiv Oblast
Mykhailivka, Ochakiv urban hromada, Mykolaiv Raion, Mykolaiv Oblast
Mykhailivka, Pervomaisk Raion, Mykolaiv Oblast
Mykhailivka, Bratske settlement hromada, Voznesensk Raion, Mykolaiv Oblast
Mykhailivka, Veselynove settlement hromada, Voznesensk Raion, Mykolaiv Oblast
Mykhailivka, Yelanets settlement hromada, Voznesensk Raion, Mykolaiv Oblast

Odessa Oblast
Mykhailivka, Berezivka Raion, Odessa Oblast
Mykhailivka, Bilhorod-Dnistrovskyi Raion, Odessa Oblast
Mykhailivka, Odessa Raion, Odessa Oblast
Mykhailivka, Ananiv urban hromada, Podilsk Raion, Odessa Oblast
Mykhailivka, Liubashivka settlement hromada, Podilsk Raion, Odessa Oblast

Poltava Oblast
Mykhailivka, Lubny Raion, Poltava Oblast
Mykhailivka, Myrhorod Raion, Poltava Oblast
Mykhailivka, Dykanka settlement hromada, Poltava Raion, Odesssa Oblast
Mykhailivka, Mykhailivka rural hromada, Poltava Raion, Odesssa Oblast
Mykhailivka, Zinkiv urban hromada, Poltava Raion, Odesssa Oblast

Rivne Oblast
Mykhailivka, Dubno Raion, Rivne Oblast
Mykhailivka, Ostroh urban hromada, Rivne Raion, Rivne Oblast
Mykhailivka, Rivne urban hromada, Rivne Raion, Rivne Oblast

Sumy Oblast
Mykhailivka, Konotop Raion, Sumy Oblast
Mykhailivka, Krasnopillia settlement hromada, Sumy Raion, Sumy Oblast
Mykhailivka, Lebedyn urban hromada, Sumy Raion, Sumy Oblast

Ternopil Oblast
Mykhailivka, Chortkiv Raion, Ternopil Oblast
Mykhailivka, Kremenets Raion, Ternopil Oblast
Mykhailivka, Ternopil Raion, Ternopil Oblast

Vinnytsia Oblast
Mykhailivka, Bershad urban hromada, Haisyn Raion, Vinnytsia Oblast
Mykhailivka, Haisyn urban hromada, Haisyn Raion, Vinnytsia Oblast
Mykhailivka, Mohyliv-Podilskyi Raion, Vinnytsia Oblast
Mykhailivka, Tulchyn Raion, Vinnytsia Oblast
Mykhailivka, Vinnytsia Raion, Vinnytsia Oblast
Mykhailivka, Zhmerynka Raion, Vinnytsia Oblast

Volyn Oblast
Mykhailivka, Lutsk Raion, Volyn Oblast
Mykhailivka, Volodymyr-Volynskyi Raion, Volyn Oblast

Zaporizhia Oblast
Mykhailivka, Vasylivka Raion, Zaporizhzhia Oblast
Mykhailivka, Zaporizhzhia Raion, Zaporizhzhia Oblast

Zhytomyr Oblast
Mykhailivka, Olevsk urban hromada, Korosten Raion, Zhytomyr Oblast
Mykhailivka, Zviahel Raion, Zhytomyr Oblast
Mykhailivka, Khoroshiv settlement hromada, Zhytomyr Raion, Zhytomyr Oblast
Mykhailivka, Korosten urban hromada, Zhytomyr Raion, Zhytomyr Oblast
Mykhailivka, Liubar settlement hromada, Zhytomyr Raion, Zhytomyr Oblast
Mykhailivka, Teterivka rural hromada, Zhytomyr Raion, Zhytomyr Oblast

See also
Velyka Mykhailivka, urban-type settlement in Odessa Oblast